In their native Great Britain, between 1963 and 2019, the English rock band The Searchers released 8 studio albums, 9 extended plays (EPs) and 30 singles. However, the band's international discography is complicated, due to different versions of their albums sometimes being released in other countries, particularly in the US. In some cases, the US version would be an entirely different album with different cover photos and tracks (collections of material from various UK releases).

The early "core" albums and singles released from 1963 to 1967 were originally on Pye Records in the United Kingdom, and Kapp Records in the United States. Later, they released records on Liberty, RCA, Sire and PRT Records. Their last studio album Hungry Hearts was released only in Germany on Coconut Records. The Searchers did not release any official live album in the UK (although there were several low-cost concert albums or live collector's CDs). Philips Records recorded their performance in 1963 at the German Star-Club, Hamburg. These songs were later released in many variations especially in Germany and the US. Many UK album tracks were also released as a singles in different countries and sometimes became hits (e. i. "Love Potion No. 9", "Ain't That Just Like Me", "Bumble Bee", "I Don't Want to Go On Without You" etc.). Additionally, they released three SPs with German language versions of their hits and one EP in French.

The Searchers' discography was originally released on the vinyl format, with full-length long plays (LPs), shorter EPs (mostly 4 songs) and singles (2 songs). Over the years, the collection has also been released on many compact discs (CDs).

Albums 

Searchers album releases varied significantly between the UK and the US; even those with the same or similar names had different contents. In addition, very many compilation and repackaging releases have been made over the years.

US Albums 

Searchers album releases varied significantly between the UK and the US; even those with the same or similar names had different contents.

Compilation albums
There are about 150 Searchers compilation albums that have been released in many countries. Some contained early 1960s songs that did not appear on previous albums. This list is selective.

https://en.m.wikipedia.org/wiki/The_Searchers_discography#/editor/3

Collectors editions
There are some Searchers CD compilation albums with previously unreleased materials.

Box sets

Private pressing
As CD making processes have become more available and cheaper, the band released several concert CDs marked as "Private pressing" (not to be confused with CD-R). Albums were produced purely for sale at Searchers shows.
 1998 – Live!
 2000 – Live II
 2003 – Live III
 2005 – On Stage
 2008 – The Definitive Searchers Live in Concert
 2010 – Still Searching
 2012 – Tracks Of Our Years

Singles

EPs

An extended play (EPs) contains more tracks than a single (usually 4 in the 1960s) but is usually distinct from an album (LP). It was sold in a special picture sleeve. The British discography is shown (plus one Searchers' EP released only in France with songs sung in French).

Notes

References

External links
Song list (fan site)
Fan site: Discography by M. Denger

Discographies of British artists
Rock music group discographies
Pop music group discographies